The Peach Mountain Observatory (PMO) is an astronomical observatory owned and operated by the University of Michigan (UM). It was opened in 1955, and is used for research, instruction, and amateur observing.

Other observatories that UM has operated include the Detroit Observatory (Ann Arbor, Michigan, 1854), the Angell Hall Observatory (Ann Arbor, Michigan, 1927), the Lamont–Hussey Observatory (South Africa, 1928), the McMath–Hulbert Observatory (Lake Angelus, Michigan, 1930), and the Portage Lake Observatory (Dexter, Michigan, 1948).

Telescopes

 The  Peach Mountain Radio Telescope is parabolic reflector built in 1958 with funds provided by the United States Navy Office of Naval Research. Since the mid-1960s it has focused on the monitoring the flux density and linear polarization of radio emissions from active extragalactic objects. Use of the telescope ceased after 2010.
 The  McMath–Hulbert Telescope, formally known as Francis C. McMath Memorial 24-Inch Reflecting Telescope, was built in 1940 and installed at the nearby McMath–Hulbert Observatory. It was dismantled in 1958 and then re-installed in a new building at PMO in 1959. UM stopped using the telescope in 1979 and transferred control to the University Lowbrow Astronomers, an amateur astronomy club at UM.
 A  radio telescope was completed in 1956, but it has not been used for decades.  The control building continues to be used by the UM Astronomy Department.

See also 
 List of astronomical observatories

References

External links
 Department of Astronomy at the University of Michigan
 University Lowbrow Astronomers homepage
 Peach Mountain Observatory Clear Sky Clock Forecasts of observing conditions.

Astronomical observatories in Michigan
University of Michigan
Buildings and structures in Washtenaw County, Michigan
1955 establishments in Michigan